The 2021 FFA Cup preliminary rounds were the qualifying competition to decide 23 of the 32 teams to take part in the 2021 FFA Cup. The competition commenced in February and was completed in November.

Schedule
The fixtures for the competition were as follows.

 Some round dates in respective Federations overlap due to separate scheduling of Zones/Sub-Zones.

Format
There were changes to the make-up of the entrants compared to the 2019 edition, with South Australia increasing from 1 to 2 qualifying places, and NSW losing one place. Additionally, the top eight placed A-League clubs for the 2020–21 A-League season gained automatic qualification to the Round of 32. The remaining four teams were subject to a play-off series for the remaining two positions.

The preliminary rounds structures were as follows, and refer to the different levels in the unofficial Australian association football league system:

Qualifying round:
55 Victorian clubs from level 9 and from regional leagues entered at this stage.

First round:
76 Victorian clubs (28 from the previous round and 48 teams from level 8) entered at this stage.

Second round:
122 New South Wales clubs level 6 and below entered this stage.
46 Northern New South Wales clubs level 4 and below entered this stage.
87 Queensland clubs (level 4 and below) entered this stage.
62 Victorian clubs (38 from the previous round and 24 teams from level 7) entered this stage.
24 Western Australian clubs from level 5 and below, including from regional leagues, entered this stage.

Third round:
13 Australian Capital Territory clubs from level 3 and below entered this stage.
90 New South Wales Clubs (67 from the previous round and 23 teams from levels 4–5) entered this stage.
44 Northern New South Wales clubs (33 from the previous round and 11 level 3) entered this stage.
76 Queensland clubs (50 from the previous round and 26 teams from level 4 and below) entered this stage.
41 South Australian clubs from level 3 and below entered this stage.
12 Tasmanian clubs from level 3 and below entered this stage.
100 Victorian clubs (31 from the previous round and 69 teams from levels 3–6) entered this stage.
42 Western Australian clubs (12 from the previous round and 30 teams from levels 3 and 4) entered this stage.

Fourth round:
16 Australian Capital Territory clubs (8 from the previous round and 8 teams from level 2) entered this stage.
64 New South Wales Clubs (45 from the previous round and 19 teams from levels 2–3) entered this stage.
32 Northern New South Wales clubs (22 from the previous round and 10 level 2) entered this stage.
11 Northern Territory clubs (7 from Norzone (Darwin) and 4 from FICA (Alice Springs)) from levels 2–3 entered this stage.
64 Queensland clubs (39 from the previous round and 25 teams from level 2 and 3) entered this stage.
32 South Australian clubs (21 from the previous round and 11 teams from level 2) entered this stage.
16 Tasmanian clubs (6 from the previous round and 10 teams from level 2 and 3) entered this stage.
64 Victorian clubs (50 from the previous round and 14 teams from level 2) entered this stage.
32 Western Australian clubs (21 from the previous round and 11 teams from level 2) entered this stage.

Fifth round:
8 Australian Capital Territory clubs progressed to this stage.
32 New South Wales clubs progressed to this stage.
16 Northern New South Wales clubs progressed to this stage.
8 Northern Territory clubs (6 from the previous round and 2 Norzone (Darwin) teams from level 2) entered this stage.
32 Queensland clubs progressed to this stage.
16 South Australian clubs progressed to this stage.
8 Tasmanian clubs progressed to this stage.
32 Victorian clubs progressed to this stage.
16 Western Australian clubs progressed to this stage.

Sixth round:
4 Australian Capital Territory clubs progressed to this stage.
16 New South Wales clubs progressed to this stage.
8 Northern New South Wales clubs progressed to this stage.
4 Northern Territory clubs progressed to this stage.
16 Queensland clubs progressed to this stage.
8 South Australian clubs progressed to this stage.
4 Tasmanian clubs progressed to this stage.
16 Victorian clubs progressed to this stage.
8 Western Australian clubs progressed to this stage.

Seventh round:
2 Australian Capital Territory clubs progressed to this stage, which doubled as the Final of the Federation Cup.
8 New South Wales clubs progressed to this stage.
4 Northern New South Wales clubs progressed to this stage.
2 Northern Territory clubs progressed to this stage, which doubled as the NT FFA Cup Final.
8 Queensland clubs progressed to this stage; 2 from Central and North Queensland, and 6 from South East Queensland.
4 South Australian clubs progressed to this stage. The 2 winners also participated in the Grand Final of the Federation Cup.
2 Tasmanian clubs progressed to this stage, which doubled as the Grand Final of the Milan Lakoseljac Cup.
8 Victorian clubs progressed to this stage. The 4 winners also qualified to the final rounds of the Dockerty Cup.
4 Western Australian clubs progressed to this stage. The 2 winners also participated in the Final of the Football West State Cup.

Play-off round:
 The four lowest-ranked teams in the 2020–21 A-League played-off for two spots in the Round of 32.

Key to Abbreviations

Qualifying round  
The draw for the qualifying round was conducted on 4 February 2021. A total of 55 clubs from Men's State League 5, Bendigo Amateur Soccer League, Ballarat & District Soccer Association, Sunraysia, Metropolitan League, and Latrobe Valley Soccer League in Victoria entered at this stage.

Notes:
 w/o = Walkover
 † = After extra time
 VIC Byes – Tatura SC (10).

First round

Notes:
 w/o = Walkover
 † = After extra time

Second round

Notes:
 w/o = Walkover
 † = After extra time
 NSW Byes – Forest Killarney (7), Glenmore Park (6), Glory FC (6), Hills Spirit (8), Holroyd Rangers (6), Lane Cove (7), Lithgow Workmens (6), Liverpool Olympic (6), Roselands FC (6), St. Patrick's FC (6), West Ryde Rovers (6), Wollongong Olympic (6).
 NNSW Byes – Bellingen FC (5), Beresfield United Seniors (4), Boambee Bombers (4), Bolwarra Lorn (6), Camden Haven Redbacks (5), Coffs City United (4), Coffs Coast Tigers (4), Garden Suburb (5), Kempsey Saints (4), Macleay Valley Rangers (4), Mayfield United Junior (7), Nambucca Strikers (5), Nelson Bay (6), Northern Storm (4), Oxley Vale Attunga (4), Port Macquarie United (4), Port Saints (4), Sawtell FC (4), Taree Wildcats (4), Westlawn Tigers (4).
 QLD Byes – Bluebirds United (5), Brisbane Athletic (6), Buderim Wanderers (5), Burleigh Heads (5), Capricorn Coast (5), S.C. Corinthians (5), Gympie United (5), Logan Metro (6), Ormeau FC (8), Pine Rivers Athletic (8),  Ripley Valley (6), Tallebudgera Valley (8), The Gap (5), Tinana FC (6).
 WA Byes – Bunbury United (10), Hamersley Rovers (5), Northern City (9), Perth AFC (8), Riverside CFC (10), South West Phoenix (5).

Third round

Notes:
 w/o = Walkover
 † = After extra time
 ACT Byes – Brindabella Blues (3), Queanbeyan City (3), UC Stars (4).
 QLD Byes – Mackay Lions SC (5), Magpies FC (5).
 SA Bye – Fulham United (3).

Fourth round

Notes:
 w/o = Walkover
 † = After extra time    
NT Bye – Port Darwin (2).

Fifth round

Notes:
 † = After extra time

Sixth round

Notes:
 † = After extra time

Seventh round

Notes
 † = After extra time

Play-off round

References

External links
 Official website

FFA Cup preliminary
2021 in Australian soccer
Australia Cup preliminary rounds